The 1981 Copa Interamericana was the 8th edition of the Copa Interamericana. The match-up featured Mexican club UNAM, the winners of the 1980 CONCACAF Champions' Cup, and Uruguayan club Nacional, the winners of the 1980 Copa Libertadores. It was played staged over two legs.

UNAM defeated Nacional 6–5 on aggregate following a play-off to win their first Copa Interamericana title.

Teams

Venues

Matches

First leg

Summary
In the 5th minute, Hugo Sánchez opened the scoring for UNAM. In the second half, Nacional fought back and found an equaliser from Víctor Espárrago, scored in the 57th minute. Ricardo Ferretti then restored UNAM's lead, to make the score 2–1 in the 60th minute. Hugo Sánchez got his second goal of the match in the 85th minute.

Details

Second leg

Summary
The game was goalless until the 70th minute mark, when Wilmar Cabrera put Nacional ahead, in the 77th José Cabrera scored to make it 2–0, then Wilmar Cabrera in the 81st minute scored his second of the match to make it 3–0. However, the game was to end at 3–1 after Gustavo Vargas with three minutes to go scored for UNAM, forcing a play-off.

Details

Play-off

Summary
The play-off leg finally went ahead after a month with Los Angeles as the neutral site. Nacional opened the scoring at the 17th minute from José Cabrera. Ricardo Ferretti equalised at the 69th minute. In the 89th minute, Gustavo Vargas scored the winning goal for UNAM.

Details

References

1
i
i
i
i
Football in Montevideo